War Dogs is a 1943 American one-reel World War II animated cartoon directed by William Hanna and Joseph Barbera. Released with the film Best Foot Forward by Metro-Goldwyn-Mayer, its main theme is war dogs training that is shown with one yellow dim-witted dog.

Plot
The cartoon is a mockumentary about the secret canine war unit "The WOOFss day regime. The camera shows many war dogs (including Spike from Tom & Jerry (voiced by Billy Bletcher) and the St. Bernard (from Puttin' on the Dog) sleeping and doing laughable things. The camera concentrates on one yellow dog, Private Smiley, sleeping in its tent and dreaming about chasing a caricatured Japanese soldier. Then, it wakes up and marks the fourth Japanese beaten in his slumber. Then, the trumpet rings a signal to gather up, and all dogs expect the yellow one run on signal. The yellow dog sleeps so soundly that a man douses it with water. Then the roll is called. All dogs except the yellow one bark to roll call. Then, the commander orders a yellow dog to march and then to do various commands with funny effort.

Then, the yellow dog sits in cabinet trying to distinguish the military things and not-military things again with funny efforts. At one moment, frame with pin-up girl appears and dog gazes on it even when next frame is shown by moving the border of it. When a frame with Hitler is shown, the dog tears apart the frames with anger and makes inscription "BUY BONDS" from frame remains.

Then message delivery training is depicted. The yellow dog carries a letter and tiny dog carries a P.S. message (a size gag).

Later the yellow dog builds a tent (even with a fire hydrant!) within a time limit. Looks like all is done, but when dog pulls one non-connected thread, all tent dismantles back.

Then, we see how yellow dog tries to ski and drive aircraft, both unsuccessful. Then, we look at the parachute training. Dog don't wants to jump from the aircraft, but when he sees bone thrown away in the air by man, he jumps to bone, but without parachute bag. Dog understands that he is in air, but it's too late, and dog crashes. Dog lies in hospital with fractures and next to him lies....broken bone.

Then, dog puts on the helmet and tests what impact its head will bear with helmet. The dog bears even 500 newton hammer impact, but falls shortly after taking it. Dog then must distinguish the real tree from the soldiers camouflaged as trees. He almost pisses on one of camouflaged soldiers, but they quickly go out from dog. Dog realizes that he is on real battlefield, and explores the battlefield by holding on rolling tank hidden under him. Dog hides in straw, but he doesn't know that he is hidden in anti-aircraft gun cloaked in straw. The anti-aircraft gun shoots the dog into general headquarters's tents, and the tents fall one by one like dominoes.

Then, camera shows us that dog is arrested for its deeds and sitting in jail-like kennel, but the dog sleeps happily.

External links

1943 films
1943 animated films
1943 short films
Metro-Goldwyn-Mayer animated short films
American World War II propaganda shorts
World War II films made in wartime
Animated films about dogs
Short films directed by William Hanna
Short films directed by Joseph Barbera
1940s American animated films
1940s animated short films
Metro-Goldwyn-Mayer films
Films scored by Scott Bradley
Films about war dogs
Films produced by Fred Quimby
Metro-Goldwyn-Mayer cartoon studio short films